Rosicrucian Digest is a publication of AMORC, published continuously from 1915.

It is sent to members via correspondence, but it is also available to the general public.

Issues of Rosicrucian Digest can be read at the website of the English Grand Lodge of the Americas.

It is not the same as Rosicrucian Forum, another publication of AMORC that is available only to members.

In the past Rosicrucian Digest was named Mystic Triangle.

See also
 Rosicrucian Forum
 AMORC
 Rosicrucianism

External links
 Celebrating 100 Years of the Rosicrucian Digest, volume 100, number 1 (2022)  
 Archive of Rosicrucian Digest

Publications established in 1915